Ésforta Arena Hachiōji is an arena in Hachioji, Tokyo, Japan. It is the home arena of the Tokyo Hachioji Bee Trains of the B.League, Japan's professional basketball league.

Gallery

References

Basketball venues in Japan
Indoor arenas in Japan
Sports venues in Tokyo
Tokyo Hachioji Trains
Hachiōji, Tokyo
Sports venues completed in 2014
2014 establishments in Japan